Bristol, Wisconsin may refer to:
Bristol, Dane County, Wisconsin, a town in Dane County
Bristol (town), Kenosha County, Wisconsin, a former town in Kenosha County
Bristol (village), Wisconsin, a village in Kenosha County

See also
 Bristol Renaissance Faire, a permanent Renaissance theme-park village in Kenosha County